Asiab Sar (also Romanized as Āsīāb Sar) is a village in Taher Gurab Rural District, in the Central District of Sowme'eh Sara County, Gilan Province, Iran. At the 2006 census, its population was 432, in 114 families.

References 

Populated places in Sowme'eh Sara County